The First Mourning (in French Premier Deuil) is an oil on canvas painted in 1888 by William-Adolphe Bouguereau. It is in the Museo Nacional de Bellas Artes in Buenos Aires, Argentina.

This work depicts the moment after Adam and Eve just found the body of their son Abel, who was murdered by Cain. This is the first human death recorded in the Bible. 

Bouguereau had suffered the loss of his second son shortly before painting this work.

Its original name is "Premier Deuil", in French, of which "The First Mourning" is a literal translation.

References

1888 paintings
Paintings depicting Adam and Eve
Paintings by William-Adolphe Bouguereau
Culture in Buenos Aires
Cultural depictions of Cain and Abel
Cultural depictions of Adam and Eve
Paintings about death
Christian art about death
Paintings in Argentina
Paintings depicting Cain and Abel